Almirante Maximiano (H-41) is an ice-strengthened oceanographic research ship of the Brazilian Navy. The ship bears this name in honor of Admiral Maximiano Eduardo da Silva Fonseca. It was built by the Todd Pacific Shipyards of Seattle, Washington, and was launched on 13 February 1974. It was acquired by the Brazilian Navy on 3 September 2008 for the Brazilian Antarctic Program. Prior to Brazilian service, the ship served commercial operations under the names Ocean Empress, Naeraberg, American Empress, Maureen Sea, Scotoil I and Theriot Offshore I.

Operational history

In November 2017 the ship actively participated in the search for the Argentine submarine , which disappeared during on patrol along the Argentine coast.

References

Naval ships of Brazil
Auxiliary ships of the Brazilian Navy
1974 ships